Karen Kaye Caldwell (born February 25, 1956) is a United States district judge of the United States District Court for the Eastern District of Kentucky.

Education and prior career
Caldwell earned her Bachelor of Arts degree in 1977 from Transylvania University, and her Juris Doctor from University of Kentucky College of Law in 1980. She worked as a field claims representative for State Farm Insurance from 1980 until 1987, and also worked as an adjunct professor at Eastern Kentucky University during the years of 1984, 1985, and 1987.  She then served as an Assistant United States Attorney for the Eastern District of Kentucky, from 1987 to 1990.  She was appointed United States Attorney for the Eastern District of Kentucky in 1991, by President George H. W. Bush, and served in that capacity until 1993, when she entered private practice. One of the firms Caldwell worked for was Dinsmore & Shohl, where she was made partner at their Louisville office. Caldwell also temporarily returned to teaching, serving as an adjunct professor at her alma mater, Transylvania University, during the 2000 school year.

A Courier Journal report on Caldwell's appointment as U.S. attorney in 1991 noted that she had dated senator Mitch McConnell. McConnell, who recommended Caldwell for that position, said at the time that she was well qualified and should not be barred from the position because of their personal relationship.

Federal judicial service
Caldwell was nominated by President George W. Bush on September 4, 2001, to a seat vacated by Henry Rupert Wilhoit Jr. She was confirmed by the Senate on October 23, 2001, and received her commission on October 24, 2001. She served as Chief Judge from October 15, 2012 until August 2019.

In 2007, she was honored by the University of Kentucky College of Law and the Kentucky Bar Association by being inducted into the College's Hall of Fame.

References

External links

Listing of Caldwell's judicial opinions, courtesy of Justia.com

1956 births
Living people
Assistant United States Attorneys
Eastern Kentucky University faculty
Judges of the United States District Court for the Eastern District of Kentucky
Transylvania University alumni
Transylvania University faculty
United States Attorneys for the Eastern District of Kentucky
United States district court judges appointed by George W. Bush
21st-century American judges
University of Kentucky College of Law alumni
Women in Kentucky politics
21st-century American women judges